The scarlet gourds  are a genus (Coccinia from the Greek, kokkinia or kokkinias - "red" or "scarlet") with 25 species. It is distributed in sub-Saharan Africa and with one species, C. grandis also in South and South-east Asia, and it is also introduced into the New World. Incidentally, C. grandis is also a cultivated crop and it is used for culinary and medical purposes.

Description 
Coccinia species are perennial climbing or creeping herbs. Climbing is supported by simple of unequally bifid tendrils. Most species develop a tuber from the hypocotyl, sometimes on roots. The cotyledons are simple, entire and have an blunt tip. The leaves are usually stalked, rarely sessile. The leaves are simple to deeply lobed, usually with teeth along the margin. The lower leaf side often bears small nectar-producing glands.

Coccinia species are dioecious, meaning that individual plants produce flowers with only male or only female organs. The sepals are connected and have five triangulate to lineal lobes. The corolla is also connected at the base and has five free lobes. The color of the corolla is creamy white to yellowish orange, rarely also snow-white or pinkish.
The male flowers are solitary, in fascicles or often in racemes, female flowers are usually solitary, sometimes also in racemes. Male flowers have three stamens that are connected to a single filament column. The anthers form a globose head. The pollen is produced in S-shaped thecae. Female flowers have an inferior ovary consisting of three carpels and producing a single style. Each carpel ends in a bulging or 2-lobed stigma. Whereas male flowers lack any sign of female organs, female flowers contain three sterile stamens (staminodes). The fruit is a berry with red flesh and a red skin that rarely exhibits a white longitudinal mottling. The seeds are enclosed in a juicy hull (aril), grayish-beige, flat to lentil-shaped.

Distribution 
All species occur in sub-Saharan Africa, from semi-arid savannas to rain forests, rarely also mountain forests. The species adapted to these different habitats one to several times independently.
 One species, C. grandis also occurs in tropical Asia, but is also spreading to Australia, several Pacific Islands and the tropical Americas. Sometimes it behaves invasive, e.g. in Hawaii, where it is regarded as obnoxious weed.

Use 
The genus Coccinia is best known for C. grandis, commonly known as "ivy gourd". Its fruits can be eaten raw when ripe or cooked when unripe. In the latter case, it is used in curries. Young leaves and shoots are also edible. All used plants are a good source of carotenoids. The tuber of Coccinia abyssinica is cooked and a source of starch for the Oromo people in Ethiopia. Local culinary uses also exist. However, many species and also populations within species can be bitter due to cucurbitacins.

Coccinia grandis is also well known in ayurvedic medicine for diabetes treatment, and modern research seems to confirm that it might be of value in that application.

Primary literature

Gallery

References

External links 

 
Cucurbitaceae genera
Dioecious plants